Gregoryite is an anhydrous carbonate mineral that is rich in potassium and sodium with the chemical formula .  It is one of the two main ingredients of natrocarbonatite, found naturally in the lava of Ol Doinyo Lengai volcano, the other being nyerereite.

Because of its anhydrous nature, gregoryite reacts quickly with the environment, causing the dark lava to be converted to white substance within hours.

Gregoryite was first described in 1980 and named after the British geologist and author John Walter Gregory (1864–1932), who studied the East African Rift Valley. It occurs associated with nyerereite, alabandite, halite, sylvite, fluorite and calcite.

References

Calc-alkaline rocks
Hexagonal minerals
Minerals in space group 186
Carbonate minerals
Volcanology